Hayesville is a central township, and one of the six townships of Clay County, North Carolina, United States. The other five are Brasstown, Hiawassee, Shooting Creek, Sweetwater, and Tusquittee.

Cities and Towns
Hayesville is home to the county seat, Hayesville, the town of the same name.

References

Townships in Clay County, North Carolina
Townships in North Carolina